Alain Romans (1905, Poland – 1988) was a French jazz composer.  He studied in Leipzig, Berlin, and Paris.  His teachers included Vincent d'Indy.  He later worked with Josephine Baker and Django Reinhardt.

Romans wrote music for 12 films.  The most famous of them are the films of comedian Jacques Tati, including Les Vacances de Monsieur Hulot (1953), with the theme song "Quel temps fait-il a Paris?", and Mon Oncle (1959).

External links
Settling the Score, mini-biography of Alain Romans

French film score composers
French male film score composers
1905 births
1988 deaths
20th-century French composers
20th-century French male musicians